The Canton of Saint-Valery-sur-Somme is a former canton situated in the Somme department of northern France. It was disbanded following the French canton reorganisation which came into effect in March 2015. It had 11,583 inhabitants (2012).

Geography 
The canton is organised around Saint-Valery-sur-Somme in the arrondissement of Abbeville. The altitude varies from  0m (Boismont) to 90m (Franleu) for an average altitude of 24m.

The canton comprised 12 communes:

Arrest
Boismont
Brutelles
Cayeux-sur-Mer
Estrébœuf
Franleu
Lanchères
Mons-Boubert
Pendé
Saigneville
Saint-Blimont
Saint-Valery-sur-Somme

Population

See also
 Arrondissements of the Somme department
 Cantons of the Somme department
 Communes of the Somme department

References

Saint-Valery-sur-Somme
2015 disestablishments in France
States and territories disestablished in 2015